FV Lauda is a German association football club from the city of Lauda-Königshofen, Baden-Württemberg, established on 28 March 1913. It briefly became part of Turnverein Lauda in 1920 before becoming independent again on 5 June 1923.



History
Throughout the late 1970s and into the 1980s, FV fielded strong sides in the Verbandsliga Baden (V) and managed to break through to play as part of the Oberliga Baden-Württemberg (IV) on three separate occasions in 1981, 1985, and 1997.

Following their 1980 Baden Cup win, Lauda made its only appearance in play for the DFB Pokal (German Cup), where they were put out in the opening round by VfB Oldenburg (1:2).

The team's longest turn in Oberliga play was from 1997–2006, which included a second-place finish in 2000. The club struggled on being relegated to the Verbandsliga in 2006, earning only lower table finishes there, and was sent down to the Landesliga Odenwald (VII) after a 15th-place result in 2011. A championship at this level in 2015, when the club remained undefeated all season and won 28 of its 30 season games, took the club back up to the Verbandsliga.

Honours
The club's honours:

League
 Verbandsliga Baden
 Champions: 1981, 1985, 1997
 Landesliga Odenwald
 Champions: 2015

Cup
 North Baden Cup
 Winners: 1980
 Runners-up: 1997, 2000

Recent seasons
The recent season-by-season performance of the club:

 With the introduction of the Regionalligas in 1994 and the 3. Liga in 2008 as the new third tier, below the 2. Bundesliga, all leagues below dropped one tier.

References

External links
Official team site
FV Lauda profile at Weltfussball.de
Das deutsche Fußball-Archiv historical German domestic league tables 

Football clubs in Germany
Football clubs in Baden-Württemberg
Association football clubs established in 1913
1913 establishments in Germany